Hochzeit (German for "wedding") may refer to:

Hochzeit, village in Germany prior to 1945, now Stare Osieczno in Poland
Die Hochzeit uncompleted opera by Wagner
Hochzeit (Subway to Sally album)